Mohamed Bahaa Eldeen Abou Shaka is an Egyptian lawyer and politician. He is a professor of public law, and the current President of the New Wafd Party.

He is the founder of Abou-Shoka Advocates, a Cairo law practice, and was a member of the Shura Council twice.

In August 2010, he spoke out against boycotting the Egyptian parliamentary election, saying that it would be "like committing political suicide".

He was announced as shadow minister of legal affairs in Al Wafd's shadow cabinet.

After Hosni Mubarak stepped down from power in February 2011, Mubarak hired Abu Shoka as one of his defence team.

In May 2012 Abu Shoka questioned the secretive judicial decision to lift a travel ban on foreign NGO workers accused of raising US funds without appropriate government authorization. In mid-June 2012, he was named as a member of the revamped Constituent Assembly of Egypt. Around that time he criticised the constitutionality of the law passed which attempted to bar Ahmed Shafik from standing in the 2012 presidential election.

Abou Shaka was appointed to the House of Representatives by President Abdel Fatah El Sisi in 2015, one of twenty members of parliament appointed by the President of the Republic according to the Egyptian Constitution. He is currently head of the Legislative Committee of the Egyptian Parliament. In 2018 he was voted Leader of the Wafd Party, replacing El-Sayed El-Badawi. He has vowed to transform the Wafd Party into a key player in the Egyptian political scene.

References

Year of birth missing (living people)
Living people
Lawyers from Cairo
Members of the Egyptian Constituent Assembly of 2012